Hastula parva is a species of sea snail, a marine gastropod mollusk in the family Terebridae, the auger snails.

Description

Distribution
This marine species occurs off New Caledonia.

References

 Terryn Y. (2007). Terebridae: A Collectors Guide. Conchbooks & Natural Art. 59 pp + plates.

External links
 Fedosov, A. E.; Malcolm, G.; Terryn, Y.; Gorson, J.; Modica, M. V.; Holford, M.; Puillandre, N. (2020). Phylogenetic classification of the family Terebridae (Neogastropoda: Conoidea). Journal of Molluscan Studies. 85(4): 359–388

Terebridae
Gastropods described in 1873